The Edge Hall Road Community Stadium is a rugby union community stadium, located in Orrell, Greater Manchester. Originally built as the permanent ground of the local Orrell rugby union team, but the club departed the stadium in 2007, with the development team of Wigan Warriors beginning to use the ground that same year.

While the ground has a technical capacity of 5,500, the safety certificate only allows 3,000 at present, due partly to damaged terracing. The Wigan Warriors senior team also uses the ground as their training complex. Throughout the latest years, the stadium has had name sponsorship, including The Co-operative, The Wigan Laundry and recently Solid Strip.

History

1950–2007: Orrell senior team
Edge Hall Road became the permanent  residence of Orrell R.U.F.C. in 1950, replacing several locations previously used by the club, including Kitt Green and Abbey Lakes, both areas within Orrell.

Orrell RUFC were once a successful rugby union team, but the advent of professionalism saw them struggle to return to the Guinness Premiership following their relegation in 1997.

With mounting debt, the club was sold to Dave Whelan, then owner of Wigan Warriors and current Wigan Athletic chairman. Following his takeover of the club, and the death of the landlord, the ground and its surrounding land was sold to Mr. Whelan's company, Whelco Holdings. After several successful seasons, Whelan withdrew his financial backing and the club again began to struggle, Whelan charging £1,000 per match to use the stadium. This excessive rent, coupled with Whelan's decision to ban the club from accessing the clubhouse, forced the club to relocate to playing fields at St John Rigby college for the 2007–08 season.

In January 2007, the clubhouse was converted into a state of the art training facility for the Wigan Warriors Rugby League Club.

2007–present: Wigan Academy
The pitch is currently used for training and Wigan Academy games. Wigan chairman Ian Lenagan has recently suggested that he will be investing in ground improvements to enable the Warriors to play lower-key games in the near future. While the ground has a technical capacity of 5,500, the safety certificate only allows 3,000 at present, due partly to damaged terracing. Expected improvements would be replacement of this terracing and a permanent food and drink outlet. As of the 2008 season, fans have been banned from parking inside the ground and have faced increased admission prices.

On 7 July 2008 Wigan Warriors announced a new three year sponsorship deal with the Co-operative and as part of the deal changed Edge Hall Road to The Co-operative Community Stadium.  In April 2013 the ground was renamed The Wigan Laundry Company Community Stadium after a draw. Twelve months later, the naming rights went to Solid Strip.

References

External links
 Edge Hall Road Community Stadium at Wigan Warriors Fans Website

Rugby union stadiums in England
Sports venues in Greater Manchester
Defunct rugby union venues in England
Buildings and structures in the Metropolitan Borough of Wigan
Rugby league stadiums in England
Wigan Warriors
Sports venues completed in 1950